The 2022 elections for the Florida State Senate took place on Tuesday, November 8, 2022, to elect state senators from all 40 districts. Although on ordinary years, 20 senators are elected at a time on a staggered basis, races following redistricting elect all 40 members to ensure that each member represents an equal number of constituents. The Republican Party expanded their Senate majority from 24 to 28, gaining a supermajority in the Senate.  The concurrently held House elections also resulted in a supermajority, giving Republicans supermajority control of the legislature.

Retiring incumbents

Democratic
6th district: Audrey Gibson (term-limited)

Republican
2nd district: George Gainer
4th district: Aaron Bean (term-limited) (running for Congress)
10th district: Wilton Simpson (term-limited) (running for Commissioner of Agriculture)
12th district: Dennis Baxley (term-limited)
22nd district: Kelli Stargel (term-limited) (running for Congress)
24th district: Jeff Brandes (term-limited)

Overview

Closest races 
Seats where the margin of victory was under 10%:
 
  gain  
  gain
 
 
  gain

Predictions

District 1

The incumbent is Republican Doug Broxson, who is running for re-election.

Republican primary

Candidates
Doug Broxson, incumbent state senator
John Mills, retired U.S. Navy pilot and perennial candidate

Endorsements

Results

Democratic nominee
Charlie Nichols, former school administrator and U.S. Army veteran

General election

Results

District 2

The incumbent is Republican George Gainer, who is not running for re-election.

Republican primary

Candidates
Regina Piazza, civil engineer
Jay Trumbull, state representative

Endorsements

Results

Democratic nominee
Carolynn Zonia, former emergency physician

General election

Results

District 3

The incumbent is Democrat Loranne Ausley, who is running for re-election.

Democratic nominee
Loranne Ausley, incumbent state senator

Republican nominee
Corey Simon, AmeriCorps Florida administrator and former NFL player

General election

Endorsements

Results

District 4

The incumbent is Republican Aaron Bean, who is term-limited and cannot seek re-election, and is instead running for U.S. House.

Republican nominee
Clay Yarborough, state representative

Democratic nominee
Sharmin Smith, author

General election

Endorsements

Results

District 5

The incumbent is Democrat Audrey Gibson, who is term-limited and cannot seek re-election.

Democratic primary

Candidates
Tracie Davis, state representative
Reggie Gaffney, Jacksonville city councillor

Endorsements

Results

Republican nominee
Binod Kumar, retired JEA engineer

General election

Results

District 6

The incumbent is Republican Jennifer Bradley. Bradley is running for re-election unopposed, so both the primary and general elections were canceled.

Republican nominee
Jennifer Bradley, incumbent state senator

Endorsements

General election

Results

District 7

The incumbent is Republican Travis Hutson, who is running for re-election.

Republican primary

Candidates
Gerry James, minister and former professional wrestler
Travis Hutson, incumbent state senator

Endorsements

Results

General election

Results

District 8

The incumbent is Republican Tom Wright, who is running for re-election.

Republican nominee
Tom Wright, incumbent state senator

Democratic primary

Candidates
Richard Paul Dembinsky, perennial candidate
Andrea Williams, nonprofit manager

Results

General election

Endorsements

Results

District 9

The incumbent is Republican Keith Perry, who is running for re-election.

Republican nominee
Keith Perry, incumbent state senator

Democratic nominee
Rodney Long, former Alachua County commissioner

General election

Endorsements

Results

District 10

The incumbent is Republican Jason Brodeur, who is running for re-election.

Republican primary

Candidates
Jason Brodeur, incumbent state senator
Denali Charres, registered nurse

Endorsements

Results

Democratic nominee
Joy Goff-Marcil, state representative

Endorsements

General election

Results

District 11

The incumbent is Republican Wilton Simpson, who is term-limited and cannot seek-election, and is instead running for Commissioner of Agriculture.

Republican nominee
Blaise Ingoglia, state representative

Green nominee
Brian Moore, retired healthcare executive, former District of Columbia Advisory Neighborhood Commission member, and perennial candidate

General election

Endorsements

Results

District 12

The incumbent is Republican Kelli Stargel, who is term-limited and cannot seek re-election, and instead ran for U.S. House.

Republican nominee
Colleen Burton, state representative

Democratic nominee
Veysel Dokur, vice chair of the Polk County Democratic Party

General election

Endorsements

Results

District 13

The incumbent is Republican Dennis Baxley, who is running for re-election.

Republican nominee
Dennis Baxley, incumbent state senator

Democratic nominee
Stephanie Dukes, retired teacher

General election

Endorsements

Results

District 14

The incumbent is Democrat Janet Cruz, who is running for re-election.

Democratic nominee
Janet Cruz, incumbent state senator

Republican nominee
Jay Collins, former Green Beret

General election

Endorsements

Results

District 15

The incumbent is Democrat Randolph Bracy, who did not seek re-election and instead ran for U.S. House. Because no non-Democrats filed to run, the general election was canceled.

Democratic primary

Candidates
Kamia Brown, state representative
Geraldine Thompson, state representative and former state senator

Endorsements

Polling

Results

General election

Results

District 16

The incumbent is Democrat Darryl Rouson, who is running for re-election.

Democratic nominee
Darryl Rouson, incumbent state senator

Republican nominee
Christina Paylan, former cosmetic surgeon and convicted felon

General election

Endorsements

Results

District 17

The incumbent is Democratic Linda Stewart, who is running for re-election.

Democratic nominee
Linda Stewart, incumbent state senator

Republican nominee
Steve Dixon, insurance agent

General election

Endorsements

Results

District 18

The incumbent is Republican Jeff Brandes, who is term-limited and cannot seek re-election.

Republican nominee
Nick DiCeglie, state representative

Democratic nominee
Eunic Ortiz, University of Florida adjunct professor and former Service Employees International Union communications director

General election

Endorsements

Results

District 19

The incumbent is Republican Debbie Mayfield. Mayfield is running for re-election unopposed, so both the primary and general elections were canceled.

Republican nominee
Debbie Mayfield, incumbent state senator

Endorsements

General election

Results

District 20

The incumbent is Republican Jim Boyd, who is running for re-election. Because no non-Republicans filed to run, the general election was canceled.

Republican primary

Candidates
Jim Boyd, incumbent state senator
John Houman, retired engineer, U.S. Navy veteran, and perennial candidate

Endorsements

Results

General election

Results

District 21

The incumbent is Republican Ed Hooper, who is running for re-election.

Republican nominee
Ed Hooper, incumbent state senator

Democratic nominee
Amaro Lionheart, filmmaker, entrepreneur, and educator

General election

Endorsements

Results

District 22

The incumbent is Republican Joe Gruters, who is running for re-election. Because no non-Republicans filed to run, the general election was canceled.

Republican primary

Candidates
Joe Gruters, incumbent state senator
Michael Johnson, community organizer and retired Fourth Estate official

Endorsements

Results

General election

Results

District 23

The incumbent is Republican Danny Burgess, who is running for re-election.

Republican nominee
Danny Burgess, incumbent state senator

Democratic nominee
Michael Harvey, pilot

General election

Endorsements

Results

District 24

The incumbent is Democrat Bobby Powell, who is running for re-election.

Democratic nominee
Bobby Powell, incumbent state senator

Republican nominee
Eric Ankner, retired correctional officer

General election

Endorsements

Results

District 25

The incumbent is Democratic Victor Torres, who is running for re-election.

Democratic nominee
Victor Torres, incumbent state senator

Republican nominee
Peter Vivaldi, radio talk show host, nominee for this district in 2016, and candidate for Florida's 9th congressional district in 2014

General election

Endorsements

Results

District 26

The incumbent is Democrat Lori Berman, who is running for re-election.

Democratic nominee
Lori Berman, incumbent state senator

Republican primary

Candidates
Steve Byers, entrepreneur
William Wheelen, retired stock trader

Results

General election

Endorsements

Results

District 27

The incumbent is Republican Ben Albritton, who is running for re-election.

Republican nominee
Ben Albritton, incumbent state senator

Democratic nominee
Christopher Proia, trucker

General election

Endorsements

Results

District 28

The incumbent is Republican Kathleen Passidomo. Passidomo is running for re-election unopposed, so both the primary and general elections were canceled.

Republican nominee
Kathleen Passidomo, incumbent state senator

Endorsements

General election

Results

District 29

Due to redistricting, this is a new district with no incumbent. Only one candidate filed to run, so both the primary and general elections were canceled.

Republican nominee
Erin Grall, state representative

Endorsements

General election

Results

District 30

The incumbent is Democrat Tina Polsky, who is running for re-election.

Democratic nominee
Tina Polsky, incumbent state senator

Republican nominee
William Reicherter, businessman

General election

Endorsements

Results

District 31

The incumbent is Republican Gayle Harrell. Harrell is running for re-election unopposed, so both the primary and general elections were canceled.

Republican nominee
Gayle Harrell, incumbent state senator

Endorsements

General election

Results

District 32

Due to redistricting, this district has two incumbents, Democrats Lauren Book and Rosalind Osgood. Book is running in the 35th district while Osgood is running for re-election in this district unopposed, so both the primary and general elections were canceled.

Democratic nominee
Rosalind Osgood, incumbent state senator

Endorsements

Results

District 33

The incumbent is Republican Ray Rodrigues, who initially ran for re-election but later dropped out of the race.

Republican nominee
Jonathan Martin, Florida SouthWestern State College trustee, chair of the Lee County Republican Party, and former Assistant State Attorney for the 20th Judicial Circuit of Florida

Independents
Richard Valenta, educator (write-in)

General election

Endorsements

Results

District 34

The incumbent is Democrat Shevrin Jones, who ran for re-election. Because no non-Democrats filed to run, the general election was canceled.

Democratic primary

Candidates
Pitchie Escarment, consultant
Erhabor Ighodaro, former vice mayor of Miami Gardens and candidate for the 35th district in 2020
Shevrin Jones, incumbent state senator

Endorsements

Results

General election

Results

District 35

Due to redistricting, this is a new district with no incumbent. However, 32nd district incumbent Democrat Lauren Book decided to run here. Because no non-Democrats filed to run, the general election was canceled.

Democratic primary

Candidates
Lauren Book, state senator from the 32nd district
Barbara Sharief, former mayor of Broward County and candidate for Florida's 20th congressional district in the 2022 special election

Endorsements

Polling

Results

General election

Results

District 36

The incumbent is Republican Ileana Garcia, who is running for re-election.

Republican nominee
Ileana Garcia, incumbent state senator

Democratic nominee
Raquel Pacheco, small business owner and U.S. Army National Guard veteran

General election

Endorsements

Results

District 37

Due to redistricting, this district has two incumbents, Democrats Gary Farmer and Jason Pizzo. Farmer is retiring to run for circuit court judge while Pizzo is running for re-election unopposed, so both the primary and general elections were canceled.

Democratic nominee
Jason Pizzo, incumbent state senator

Endorsements

General election

Results

District 38

The incumbent is Democrat Annette Taddeo, who is not running for re-election and is instead running for U.S. House.

Democratic nominee
Janelle Perez, healthcare executive and former congressional aide

Republican nominee
Alexis Calatayud, director of policy and programs at the Florida Department of Education

General election

Endorsements

Results

District 39

This seat is currently vacant, as Republican Manny Díaz Jr. resigned after being appointed Florida Commissioner of Education. Only one candidate filed to run, so both the primary and general elections were canceled.

Republican nominee
Bryan Avila, state representative

Endorsements

General election

Results

District 40

The incumbent is Republican Ana Maria Rodriguez. Rodriguez is running for re-election unopposed, so both the primary and general elections were canceled.

Republican nominee
Ana Maria Rodriguez, incumbent state senator

Endorsements

General election

Results

See also
2022 Florida elections
2022 Florida House of Representatives election
Politics of Florida
Political party strength in Florida
Florida Democratic Party
Republican Party of Florida
Government of Florida

Notes

Partisan clients

References

Senate
Florida Senate
Florida Senate elections